Budva Municipality is one of the municipalities of Montenegro. The administrative center is Town of Budva. The municipality is located at the Adriatic coast in southwestern Montenegro.

Location and tourism
It is part of the Montenegrin Littoral geographical region. It is located roughly along the middle of the Montenegrin coast, and is a center for Montenegrin beach tourism. Tourism is the main driver of the economy of Budva. It is a significant tourist destination on the eastern Adriatic, and by far the most popular destination in Montenegro. During the 2013, Budva recorded 668,931 tourist visits, and 4,468,913 overnight stays, thus accounting for 44,8% of tourist visits to Montenegro, and 47,5% of its overnight stays. The best known and most popular settlements along the Budva municipality are municipal seat Budva, Bečići, Miločer, Rafailovići, Sveti Stefan and Petrovac.

Local administration
The municipal parliament consists of 33 deputies elected directly for a four-year term. Mayor of Budva is the head of the town and Municipality of Budva. He acts on behalf of the Town, and performs an executive function in the Municipality Budva.

Demographics 
Town of Budva is the administrative centre of Budva municipality, municipality also includes the neighbouring towns of Bečići and Petrovac, and has a population of 16,707 (2011 census). The town of Budva itself has 13,338 inhabitants.

Ethnicity in 2011:
9,262 Montenegrins (48.19%)
7,247 Serbs (37.71%)
210 Russians (1.01%)
167 Croats (0.87%)
2,332 Others (12.22%)

Religion in 2011:
16.947 - Orthodox (88.18%)
654 - Islam (3.40%)
432 - Catholic (2.25%)
821 - Others (4.27%)
364 - None (1.89%)

Gallery

References

 
Municipalities of Montenegro